Drew Nelson (born August 11, 1979) is a Canadian voice, stage, film and television actor from Etobicoke, Ontario. He is best known for voicing Duncan on the Canadian cartoon series Total Drama and playing Matt Sayles in The Strain.

Personal life
Nelson was born in Etobicoke, a suburb of Toronto, Ontario, on August 11, 1979.  He attended Richview Collegiate Institute and Humber College.

Career 
He has been in numerous television shows. He first appeared in the television series Friends as an extra.

His performances include appearing as a guest-star or extra in various movies or TV shows, such as Fringe, Supernatural, and Rookie Blue. Most of Nelson's best-known roles are in cartoons, such as Duncan in Total Drama, Kai in 6Teen, and  Jason in Girlstuff/Boystuff. He also had a recurring role on the FX series, The Strain.

Nelson is also currently working on a project called Lost Ones as a writer-producer. The project is an urban fantasy centered around a 13-year-old orphan named Malik. It is set against the backdrop of hip hop and street art, and the film follows Malik and his crew as they plot to foil a greedy mayor's plans to gentrify their hood.

Filmography

Anime

Film

Television

References

External links
 
 

1979 births
Living people
Male actors from Toronto
People from Etobicoke
Canadian male television actors
Canadian male film actors
Canadian male voice actors
21st-century Canadian male actors